The Church of the Virgin Mary is a Romanian Orthodox church located at 2 Roșiori Street in Galați, Romania. It is dedicated to the Dormition of the Mother of God.

The church was dedicated in the autumn of 1647. Located on the left bank of the Danube, it was originally a monastery, built on the site of an earlier church with the same name. Conceived as a fortress, it was built by workers brought from Transylvania. Its ktitors were the Brăila merchants Die and Șerbu, as well as the local trader Constantin Teodor. From the beginning, it was placed under the protection of the Athonite Vatopedi Monastery. While visiting in 1653, Paul of Aleppo noted its presence.

Over the ensuing two centuries, wars and robbers led to the church’s deterioration, such that by 1885, Bishop Melchisedec Ștefănescu, who had earlier served in Galați, wrote: “Today, the Precista Monastery has completely lost the appearance of a fortress. It has neither the surrounding wall, nor the magnificent bell tower, nor the three spires described by Paul of Aleppo, but only two. The Turks burned and looted it many times and turned it into a customs office, where they deposited the products they gathered from around the country, before taking them to Constantinople.”

The church owes its current appearance to the thorough consolidation and renovation work that took place in 1954–1957. The communist regime converted the church into a museum of feudal history and art during 1970, opening the following year. This closed in 1990, after the Romanian Revolution. At that point, the building became a parish church, and was rededicated in 1994.

The church is listed as a historic monument by Romania's Ministry of Culture and Religious Affairs.

Notes

References
Eugen Drăgoi, Florin Marinescu, “Blestemul Jupânesei Dragolea”, in Danubius, vol. XXXV, part 2/2017, pp. 7-19

Buildings and structures in Galați
Historic monuments in Galați County
Romanian Orthodox churches in Romania
Churches completed in 1647
Fortified church buildings in Romania
Former Christian monasteries in Romania
History museums in Romania
Art museums and galleries in Romania
Defunct museums in Romania
Museums established in 1971
Museums disestablished in 1990